Mingo Swamp is a  long 4th order tributary to the South River in Sampson County, North Carolina.  Mingo Swamp along with Black River forms the South River.

Course
Mingo Swamp rises about 2.5 miles northeast of Coats, North Carolina on the Black Creek divide on the Johnston-Harnett County line.  Mingo Swamp then flows southwest then southwest to meet the Black River and form the South River about 1 mile northeast of Falcon, North Carolina.

Watershed
Mingo Swamp drains  of area and receives about 48.1 in/year of precipitation.

References

Rivers of North Carolina
Bodies of water of Buncombe County, North Carolina